Alexander Ignatius Roche (17 August 1861 – 10 March 1921) RSA NEAC RP was a Scottish artist in the late 19th century and an important figure in the "Glasgow Boys".

Life
He was born in the Gallowgate in Glasgow, the son of a milliner, Alexander Roche. He attended St Mungo's Academy in Bridgeton, Glasgow.

He originally trained as an architect, but then changed to art, studying at the Glasgow School of Art and, from 1881, at L’Ecole des Beaux Arts in Paris. Here he studied under Gustave Boulanger and Jean-Léon Gérôme. In his time here he befriended William Kennedy, John Lavery, Thomas Millie Dow and William Stott. In the early 1880s he joined a colony of Scots artists in Grez-sur-Loing south of Fontainebleau. On his return to Scotland in 1885 he joined with the Glasgow Boys working on murals for the 1888 International Exhibition.
In 1888 he travelled to Capriwhere he befriended Fabio Fabbi and Harold Speed. In following years he visited both Venice and Florence, and married an Italian girl on the latter trip. This marriage was short-lived and they separated. As both were Catholics there seems to have never been any divorce.

In 1896 he moved from Glasgow to Edinburgh and began to distance himself from the Glasgow Boys. His work drifted from largely landscape to largely portraits.

In 1906 he remarried (possibly bigamously), to Jean Alexander, daughter of Robert Alexander. During this period they enjoyed the friendship of Joseph Crawhall.

From 1907 until 1914 they lived at 8 Royal Terrace, on Calton Hill, a very prestigious property.
Around 1910 a cerebral haemorrhage caused the loss of use of its right hand and he had to retrain to paint with the left.

He died in Hailes Cottage, near the Water of Leith in Slateford, Edinburgh. He is buried in the Dean Cemetery in Edinburgh near the north-east corner of the original cemetery.

Works
Roche exhibited in the Royal Scottish Academy from 1887 and in the Royal Academy from 1890-1919.

The Dominie’s Favourites (1885)
The Shepherdess (1890)
Head of a Young Girl (1890) Hunterian Art Gallery
Mrs Roberts (1895)
Group family portrait for Andrew Carnegie (c.1900)
Margaret (1900) Royal Scottish Academy
Lady Reid (d.1924), (1908) Aberdeen Art Gallery
 Sir William Alexander Smith, founder of the Boys’ Brigade (c.1910)
River Ouse (1918) Kelvingrove Art Gallery
Le Chateau Gaillard, Hunterian Art Gallery
Corfe Castle
Afternoon Sunshine, St Monans
St Monans Kirk, Kirkcaldy Galleries
A Newhaven Fishwife, The Fleming Collection
Sir Robert Cranston
Pittenweem, Fife
The Prison Gate, Mogador, Morocco
The Old Fisherman, Scottish National Gallery
Girl in a Red Hat
Self Portrait
The Red Lion Inn
Woodland and River
The Convict Ship, Hunterian Art Gallery
William Elphinstone Malcolm of Burnfoot (1907) Langholm Town Hall
Flora Clift Stevenson
Grez
Thomas Littlejohn Galbraith, Town Clerk

Awards and recognition

Gold Medal, Munich (1891)
Honourable Mention, Paris Salon, (1892)
Gold Medal, Dresden (1897)
Elected ARSA 1894
Elected RSA 1900

References

https://web.archive.org/web/20140822102938/http://www.nationalgalleries.org/collection/artists-a-z/r/artist/alexander-ignatius-roche/object/alexander-ignatius-roche-1861-1921-artist-self-portrait-pg-1185
Calton Gallery biography

Further reading
Billcliffe, Roger (2002): The Glasgow Boys: The Glasgow School of Painting 1875-1895

External links
  

1861 births
1921 deaths
Artists from Glasgow
Scottish artists
People educated at St Mungo's Academy
Alumni of the Glasgow School of Art
Burials at the Dean Cemetery
 Scottish expatriates in Italy
 Scottish expatriates in France